An exhibition is a type of scholarship award or bursary.

United Kingdom and Ireland
At the universities of Dublin, Oxford, Cambridge and Sheffield, at some public schools, and various other UK educational establishments, an exhibition is a small financial award or grant to an individual student, normally on grounds of merit or demonstrable necessity. At Oxford and Cambridge, for example, it is typical to be awarded an exhibition for near-first-class performance in examinations; the Sheffield's "Petrie Watson Exhibition" is a grant awarded for projects which enhance or complement a current programme of study. The amount is typically less than a scholarship that covers tuition fees and/or maintenance.

In 1873, Annie Rogers came top in Oxford's entrance examinations and she was automatically qualified for an exhibition at Balliol or Worcester College, Oxford. She was denied the place because she was female. As a consolation prize she was given six volumes of Homer and her place was given to the boy who had come sixth in the tests.

Exhibitioner
An exhibitioner is a student who has been awarded an exhibition (as a scholar, in this context, is one who has been awarded a scholarship). The term is in decline because financial assistance to students is increasingly given on the grounds of need rather than scholastic merit, and because the value of historically long-standing exhibitions has dwindled due to inflation.

References

External links
Statute 10.2 — Prizes, Exhibitions, Scholarships and Bursaries, University of Melbourne, Australia

Academic terminology
Terminology of the University of Oxford
Terminology of the University of Cambridge
Scholarships in the United Kingdom